Paquito Cordero (October 16, 1932 – June 30, 2009), was a pioneer of Puerto Rican television. He  was also a comedian and a musical and television producer.

Early years
Cordero (birth name: Francisco Cordero Baez) was born to Francisco Cordero Paco and Berta Baez de Cordero in Santurce, Puerto Rico. Cordero attended Santurce Central High School upon finishing his primary and secondary education. He was a member of his high school's drama club and participated in its plays, where he discovered the art of comedy. Cordero was geatly influenced by his aunt on his father's side, Mapy Cortés. Mapy Cortés had moved to Mexico from Puerto Rico, where she became an actress. She married the Puerto Rican-born Mexican actor Fernando Cortés, a childhood friend. After Cordero graduated from high school, he enrolled and attended the University of Puerto Rico and married his childhood sweetheart, a hairdresser whom everyone knew as "Cuqui". With Cuqui he had three children, two girls and one boy.

Artistic career
Cordero auditioned for a role in a comedy skit which was transmitted through Radio El Mundo and was subsequently hired. He did this in his spare time. His aunt Mapy and her husband Fernando returned to the island and presented an idea for a comedy show to Ángel Ramos, owner of El Mundo Enterprises. On March 28, 1954, Puerto Rico received its first television transmission from Angel Ramos' WKAQ-TV Telemundo Channel 2. Among the first comedy shows to go on the air was "Mapy Y Papi" with Mapy and Fernando Cortés, María Judith Franco and Paquito Cordero.

During this period in his life, he fell in love with one of the show's dancers, a young girl by the name of Nora. He soon divorced his first wife and asked Nora to marry him. She accepted and together they had a son, Santiago.

Paquito Cordero Productions
In the 1960s, Cordero formed his own production company which he named Paquito Cordero Productions, Inc. His younger sister, Bertita, became his assistant and eventually his younger brother, Jorge, would also join the company as a future co-producer. On January 11, 1965, Telemundo transmitted the first program produced by Paquito called "El Show de las 12" (The 12 O'Clock Show). The first show included appearances by El Gran Combo, Tito Lara, Los Hispanos, and Olga y Tony. It also included a section within the show, dedicated to the teenage crowd, called "Canta la Juventud" (Youth Sings). Among those taking part in this section were Alfred D. Herger and Puerto Rican teen idols Lucecita Benítez and Chucho Avellanet. "El Show de Las 12" was presented by Miguel Ángel Álvarez and Eddie Miró was the scriptwriter. The show was a success and was watched by over 80 percent of the population, becoming one of Puerto Rico's most beloved programs for over 40 years.

Television programs produced by Cordero
Cordero also produced the following shows which were popular in Puerto Rico:

 "El Show de las 12" with "Los Alegres Tres", Silvia, Chapuseaux y Damiron with Clarissa, Militza (La India) and Mary Stull.
 "El Show Sultana", with "Los Hispanos", and Tito Lara
 "2 a Go Go", with Julio Angel & Tammy
 "Walter, las Estrellas Y Usted" (Walter, the Stars and You), with Walter Mercado
 "Mi Hippie Me Encanta" (I love my hippie) with Luis Antonio Rivera: Yoyo Boing, Rosita Velazquez, Johanna Ferrán, Raquel Montero and Myrna de Casenave
 "En Broma y en Serio"  (Joking and Seriously), with Lou Briel, and Dagmar
 "Su Estrella Favorita" (Your Favorite Star)
 "El Show de Chucho", (Chucho's Show), with  Chucho Avellanet"
 "En Casa de Juanma y Wiwi", (In Juanma & Wiwis' Home), with Awilda Carbia, and Juan Manuel Lebrón
 "Estudio Alegre & Musicomedia", (Cheerful Studio & Musicomedy), with Otilio Warrington, Awilda Carbia, Adrian Garcia and Juan Manuel Lebrón
 "La Gente Joven de Menudo/Menudomania", with Puerto Rican music group Menudo.
 "Los Kakucómicos", with Adalberto Rodriguez, Machuchal, and Shorty Castro, among many others
 "La Pensión de Doña Tere", (Lady Tere's Guesthouse), with Norma Candal, and
 "Noche de Gala", (Gala Night Ball), with Eddie Miró, and in different periods of time co-hosted by, Marisol Malaret, Deborah Carthy Deu, Marilyn Pupo and Gilda Haddock.

On April 14, 1983, Telemundo was sold to John Blair and Co. and finally, in 2004 became part of the NBC Universal network. This led to many changes and one of the changes was the substitution of locally produced programs with programs produced in other countries such as Mexico. Cordero, however, remained at Telemundo as its main local producer from 1983 to 2004.

On May 6, 2004, television producers Paquito Cordero and Tommy Muñiz received a special recognition on behalf of the House of Representatives of Puerto Rico as part of the celebration of the 50 years of uninterrupted transmission on the Telemundo and Televicentro channels.

Telemundo stops transmitting local programs
On February 25, 2005, Telemundo canceled Paquito Cordero's "El Show de las 12", the longest-running television show in Puerto Rico. Telemundo no longer transmits locally produced television programs and thus, is no longer a source of income to the local artistic class.

On the last airing of the show, Eddie Miró took the microphone and said these words:

Musical producer
At one point in his life, Cordero owned a music label, named Hit Parade. One of the acts that Cordero produced albums for was the well-known Merengue band, Conjunto Quisqueya.

Later years
In 2007, Cordero, produced a remake of "Noche de Gala", (Gala Night Ball), broadcast by WIPR-TV, Tu Universo Television, channel 6, with Deborah Carthy Deu, as the host. Cordero died of respiratory problems in the morning hours of June 30, 2009. He is survived by his wife, Nora, and four children, Paquitin, Chiqui, Muñeca and Santiago. The governor of Puerto Rico, Luis Fortuño, declared three days of national mourning. On July 2, a wake was held in the "Salon de Actos" of El Convento Dominicos in Old San Juan which was assisted by the governor and his wife, local celebrities, and Cordero's family and close friends. Cordero remains were later transferred to the Santa Maria Magdalena de Pazzis Cemetery also in Old San Juan where he was buried.

See also

 List of Puerto Ricans

Notes

References

External links
 Popular Culture

1932 births
2009 deaths
Burials at Santa María Magdalena de Pazzis Cemetery
Puerto Rican comedians
People from San Juan, Puerto Rico
Puerto Rican television personalities
Puerto Rican television producers
Television pioneers
Deaths from respiratory failure
20th-century American comedians